Ty Douglas Buttrey (born March 31, 1993) is an American professional baseball pitcher in the Houston Astros organization. He was drafted by the Boston Red Sox in the fourth round of the 2012 MLB draft. He has previously played in Major League Baseball (MLB) for the Los Angeles Angels.

Career

Boston Red Sox organization
The Boston Red Sox selected Buttrey in the fourth round of the 2012 MLB draft out of Providence High School in Charlotte, North Carolina. He had posted a 9–2 record with a 0.91 earned run average (ERA) and 100 strikeouts as a senior, averaging 13.04 strikeouts per 9 innings pitched. He signed for a signing bonus of $1,300,000, forgoing his commitment to play college baseball at the University of Arkansas.

Following four games for the Gulf Coast League Red Sox in 2012, Buttrey pitched his first full professional season in 2013 with Low-A Lowell Spinners of the New York–Penn League, where he went 4–3 with a 2.21 ERA in 13 games started. In addition, he struck out 35 batters, did not allow a home run in 61 innings and allowed over two earned runs just twice in his 13 starts.

In 2014, Buttrey dealt with injuries and ineffectiveness, resulting in a 6.85 ERA with Class A Greenville Drive. He earned a promotion to High-A Lowell Spinners after a 1–0 record with a 2.45 ERA in four starts and 22 innings. He returned for Greenville to begin 2015 and was promoted to Class A Advanced Salem Red Sox during the midseason.

In his first seven starts at Salem, Buttrey went 5–0 with a 1.71 ERA in 42 innings, being unbeaten in his combined 11 starts between A and High-A in 2015. He finished with an 8–10 record in 21 starts for Salem and was a tough luck loser, as he pitched 14 quality starts, but in five of those 14 starts was charged with the loss. Overall, he went 9–10 with a 3.92 ERA in 25 starts for Greenville and Salem, including 103 strikeouts against 48 walks in  innings.

Buttrey was assigned to Double-A Portland Sea Dogs in 2016, where he struggled with his command and averaged 5.3 walks to 5.8 strikeouts per nine innings, ending with a 1–9 record and 4.50 ERA in 32 appearances (nine starts). He opened 2017 at Portland and joined Triple-A Pawtucket Red Sox in the midseason. Overall, he went 2–5 with a 4.81 ERA and four saves in  innings of relief duties, averaging 10.5 strikeouts per 9 innings.

The Red Sox added Buttrey to their 40-man roster after the 2017 season. He started the 2018 season with Triple-A Pawtucket, for whom he was 1–1 with one save and a 2.25 ERA as he struck out 64 batters in 44 innings, averaging 13.1 strikeouts per 9 innings.

Los Angeles Angels
On July 31, 2018, the Red Sox traded Buttrey and pitcher Williams Jerez to the Los Angeles Angels for second baseman Ian Kinsler. Buttrey  made his MLB debut on August 16. He finished 2018 with an 0–1 record, a 3.31 ERA, and 20 strikeouts in  innings. 

The following season, he led the team in appearances with 72, recording a win–loss record of 6–7. In 2020, Buttrey served as closer towards the tail end of the season, recording five saves and overall registering a career-high 5.81 ERA in 27 games.

On April 2, 2021, the Angels announced that Buttrey would be stepping away from the game, and he was placed on the restricted list. On April 3, Buttrey released a statement on Instagram explaining that he was retiring from baseball because he was playing for the "wrong" reasons—for money and to prove other people wrong.

On January 9, 2022, Buttrey, who remained on the Angels' restricted list, announced on Twitter his intention to return to baseball. On April 2, 2022, Buttrey was activated off of the restricted list and optioned to the Triple-A Salt Lake Bees. On June 9, Buttrey was designated for assignment by the Angels after Dillon Thomas was added to the roster. On June 15, he cleared waivers and was sent outright to Triple-A Salt Lake. He made 34 appearances for the Bees, pitching to a 5.94 ERA with 30 strikeouts in 36.1 innings of work. He elected free agency on November 10, 2022.

Houston Astros
On January 31, 2023, Buttrey signed a minor league contract with the Houston Astros organization.

Personal life
Buttrey and his wife, Samantha, were married in 2017.

References

External links

1993 births
Living people
People from Matthews, North Carolina
Baseball players from North Carolina
Major League Baseball pitchers
Los Angeles Angels players
Gulf Coast Red Sox players
Lowell Spinners players
Greenville Drive players
Salem Red Sox players
Portland Sea Dogs players
Pawtucket Red Sox players
Peoria Javelinas players
Arizona League Angels players
Salt Lake Bees players